Macrocheilus impictus is a species of ground beetle in the subfamily Anthiinae. It was described by Wiedemann in 1823.

References

Anthiinae (beetle)
Beetles described in 1823